Lluís Companys i Jover (21 June 1882 – 15 October 1940) was a Catalan politician who served as president of Catalonia from 1934 and during the Spanish Civil War.

Companys was a lawyer close to labour movement and one of the most prominent leaders of the Republican Left of Catalonia (ERC) political party, founded in 1931. He had a key role in the events of the proclamation and first steps of the Second Spanish Republic. Appointed president of the Generalitat of Catalonia in 1934, after the death of the previous president, Francesc Macià, his government tried to consolidate the recently acquired Catalan self-government and implement a progressive agenda, despite the internal difficulties. In disagreement with the accession of the right-wing party CEDA to the Spanish government in October 1934, he proclaimed a new Catalan State, for which he was imprisoned between 1934 and 1936. 

He was still in charge of the Catalan Government during the Spanish Civil War, remaining loyal to the Republic. Exiled in France after the war, he was captured and handed over by the Nazi secret police, the Gestapo, to the Spanish State of Francisco Franco, who had him judged and executed in 1940.

Early life
Born in El Tarròs, on 21 June 1882, into a peasant family with aristocratic roots, he was the second child of ten. His parents were Josep Companys and Maria Lluïsa de Jover. His parents sent him to Barcelona in order to study at the boarding school of Liceu Poliglot. Later, after obtaining his degree in law from the University of Barcelona, where he met Francesc Layret,  Companys participated in the political life of Catalonia from a young age. In 1906, as a result of the military attack on the offices of Catalan newspapers Cu-Cut! and La Veu de Catalunya, and after the passing of the Ley de Jurisdicciones ("Law of Jurisdictions"), which made speech against Spain and its symbols a criminal offence, he participated in the creation of the successful coalition Solidaritat Catalana.

Later, he became affiliated with the ephemeral Republican Nationalist Federal Union (Unió Federal Nacionalista Republicana), where he was president of the youth section. He was investigated for his intense youth activities and was jailed fifteen times, being classified after the Tragic Week of Barcelona as a "dangerous individual" in police records.

With Francesc Layret, Companys represented the left-wing labour faction of the Partit Republicà Català (Catalan Republican Party), for which he was elected local councilor of Barcelona in 1916. In November 1920, he was arrested together with Salvador Seguí (known as El Noi del Sucre), Martí Barrera and other trade unionists and he was deported to the Castell de la Mola in Mahón, Menorca. Shortly afterward, Layret was assassinated while preparing his defence by gunmen of the Sindicatos Libres.

Despite having been deported, Companys was elected member of parliament for Sabadell in the 1920 Spanish legislative elections, taking the place of Layret, who would have taken that seat had he not been assassinated. This gave him parliamentary immunity, which secured his release from prison.

Companys was one of the founders of the peasants' trade union Unió de Rabassaires in 1922, where he worked as lawyer and director of the La Terra magazine during the years of the Primo de Rivera regime in the 1920s.

Detained again, he was unable to attend the Conferència d'Esquerres (Conference of Leftists) held from 12 to 19 March 1931 that produced the political party Esquerra Republicana de Catalunya (ERC, Republican Left of Catalonia) from the merging of Estat Català (led by Francesc Macià), the Partit Republicà Català itself and the group L'Opinió (which included Joan Lluhí as prominent figure); however, he was elected as an executive member of that party, representing the Partit Republicà Català. Thanks to the bonds between the Spanish labour movement and the Spanish trade union movement, the election of Companys to this position gave the ERC great prestige amongst left-wing public opinion as it would otherwise have been regarded as a party of the progressive petty bourgeoisie.

Proclamation of the Second Spanish Republic 
 

In the 1931 Spanish local elections ERC won a surprise victory in Barcelona and other municipalities of Catalonia. After knowing the results, on 14 April, Companys, who was elected a city representative, and other ERC candidates together with the Party's leader Francesc Macià, decided to take over by surprise the office of Mayor and entered to the City Hall. After some dispute, the transitional Mayor of Barcelona was deposed and Companys was proclaimed new Mayor. Subsequently, he hung a tricolour Spanish Republican Flag from the City Hall's balcony and proclaimed the Republic. Shortly after, Francesc Macià proclaimed the Catalan Republic within the "Federation of Iberian Republics", a project that was later abandoned after gaining the promise of regional devolution and the restitution of the Catalan Generalitat (as autonomous government) from the new Republican government.

After controlling the Barcelona City Hall, Macià ordered Companys to take the office of "Gobernador Civil" (Civil governor) of the Barcelona province (provincial political authority, which at that time held considerable powers, policing included), which had been controlled by republican radicals during the process of the Republic proclamation. Macià probably wanted a less public office for Companys, whom he thought of as a political rival. Companys ran as a Barcelona provincial candidate in the December 1931 Spanish legislative election. After gaining a seat he led the ERC representation and the Catalan minority group in the new Republican Parliament. He described his political objectives in Madrid as: "We, the Catalan members of the Parliament, have come here not only to defend our Statute of Autonomy (law of self-government), and the fraternal and democratic understanding of the members of Parliament; but, also to participate in matters that affect the greatness of Spain: the Constitution, the agrarian reforms and social legislation." In 1932 Companys was elected the first Speaker of the Parliament of Catalonia.

Presidency of Catalonia and proclamation of the Catalan State

After the death of Francesc Macià on 25 December 1933, at that time presiding over the Generalitat of Catalonia, Companys was elected the successor President of the Generalitat by the Catalan Parliament, appointing a new coalition government composed by the Republican Left of Catalonia and the other left-wing republican and catalanist parties. Under his presidency, the Parliament legislated in order to improve the living conditions of the popular classes and the petite bourgeoisie, approving laws like the Crop Contracts Law, which protected the tenant farmers and granted access to the land they were cultivating, but it was contested by the Regionalist League and provoking a legal dispute with the Spanish government led by Ricardo Samper, increasing the tensions. Meanwhile, the Generalitat established its own Court of Appeal (Tribunal de Cassació) and assumed executive powers in public order, according as the Statute of Autonomy stipulated. 

On 6 October 1934, Companys led a Catalan nationalist uprising not supported by the centre and conservative Catalan representatives, against the new centre and right-wing republican government led by Alejandro Lerroux, which included ministers from the political party CEDA, considered by many left-wing sectors as close to fascism. He proclaimed the Catalan State (Estat Català) within the "Spanish Federal Republic", for which action he was arrested and sentenced to thirty years in prison. This action was seen as an attempt at a Coup d'État as Companys revolted against the newly appointed centre-right republican government and joined the Asturias miners revolution. Companys asked Manuel Azaña, who happened to be in Barcelona during the events, to lead a newly proclaimed Spanish Republican government, a proposition that Azaña rejected. The proclamation was suppressed by the Spanish army, and the Catalan Government members were arrested. After the 1936 election and the victory of the left-wing coalition Popular Front, he was set free by the new government and the Catalan government was restored.

Civil War

When the Spanish Civil War began shortly after, in July 1936, Companys sided with the Spanish Republic against the Nacionales rebels and was instrumental in organising a collaboration between the Central Committee of Anti-Fascist Militias, which was sponsored by his Catalan government as a step to recover the control of the situation and organise the war effort, and the Workers' Party of Marxist Unification (POUM), a revolutionary anti-Stalinist communist party, and Confederación Nacional del Trabajo (CNT), an anarchist syndicalist trade union.

In November 1936 the Generalitat government were to become target of a violent coup, planned by the radical Catalanist organisation Estat Català. The conspirators intended to make Companys step down as president, and to replace him with the prime minister, Joan Casanovas; in case of resistance, Companys was to be shot. The plot was exposed and some of its leaders jailed. During the war, Companys attempted to maintain the unity of his political coalition, but after the Soviet Union's consul, Vladimir Antonov-Ovseenko, threatened that his country would cut off aid to Catalonia, he sacked Andrés Nin, a leader of POUM, from his post as Minister of Justice in December 1936.

Exile and execution

Exiled to France in 1939 after the Civil War, Companys had passed up various chances to leave France because his son Lluís was seriously ill in a clinic in Paris. He was brutally beaten and arrested by the Milice in La Baule-les-Pins near Nantes on 13 August 1940 and detained in La Santé Prison. He was then brutally beaten and extradited by Nazi German authorities to the Spanish government in Madrid in early September 1940 and imprisoned in the cellars of the headquarters of the Dirección General de Seguridad (State Security) at the Real Casa de Correos in Puerta del Sol. He was held there for five weeks, kept in solitary confinement, interrogated, starved tortured and brutally beaten, while senior figures of the Francoist State visited his cell, insulted him and threw coins or crusts of bread at him. In a military trial that lasted less than one hour and lacked legal guarantees, he was accused of military rebellion and sentenced to death. During the trial Companys was defended by Ramón de Colubi, a young soldier who had fought the war on the side of the rebels. Surprisingly, Colubí defended Companys with courage  to the point of receiving severe beatings, threats and risking his own life. Colubí asked Franco to pardon Companys but was ignored and then beaten again, this time by Franco. As a consequence of his role as defence attorney, Colubí was forced to go into exile. Víctor Gay Zaragoza, a Catalan writer, found that Companys and Colubí were relatives. All these efforts were useless, and Companys was executed at Montjuïc Castle in Barcelona at 6:30 a.m. on 15 October 1940. Refusing to wear a blindfold, he was taken before a firing squad of Civil Guards barefoot and, as they fired, he shouted 'Per Catalunya!' (For Catalonia!). He is buried at the Montjuïc Cemetery, near the castle. The cause of death was given as 'traumatic internal haemorrhage'.

The main stadium used for the 1992 Summer Olympics, located on Montjuïc, is officially named in his memory. In 1998 a monument to Companys was installed near Arc de Triomf, on Passeig de Lluís Companys in Barcelona. A friend of Companys, Conxita Julià, is portrayed next to Companys's image in the monument. Several streets and squares in many cities and villages of Catalonia are named "Lluís Companys" after him.

His personal archive is located in the Pavelló de la República CRAI Library – University of Barcelona. It consists of correspondence about him, as well as discourses and declarations between 1936 and 1938.

See also
List of people executed by Francoist Spain
Martyrs of the Spanish Civil War
Red Terror (Spain)
White Terror (Spain)

References

Sources
 
 Ossorio, Ángel (1943). Vida y sacrificio de Companys. Buenos Aires: Editorial Losada

External links

 Web: "Unpublished documents about Carme Ballester and Lluís Companys" (in Catalan)
 Inventari del Fons F-FP, Subsèrie Lluís Companys, del CRAI Biblioteca del Pavelló de la República de la Universitat de Barcelona
 

1882 births
1940 deaths
People from Urgell
Presidents of the Republican Left of Catalonia
Government ministers during the Second Spanish Republic
Members of the Congress of Deputies of the Second Spanish Republic
Presidents of the Government of Catalonia
Presidents of the Parliament of Catalonia
Spanish people of the Spanish Civil War (Republican faction)
Exiled politicians from Catalonia
Exiles of the Spanish Civil War in France
People executed by Francoist Spain
Executed Spanish people
Executed presidents
People executed by Spain by firing squad
People extradited from France
People extradited to Spain
Assassinated Spanish politicians
Burials at Montjuïc Cemetery
Civil governors of Barcelona
Spanish republicans
Inmates of Presó Model de Barcelona
Catalan Anti-Francoists